Vale School-Community House is a historic two-room school located near Oakton, Fairfax County, Virginia.  It was built about 1884 and expanded with a second room in 1912.  It is a one-story, two-room, wood-frame building on a stone and concrete foundation. It has a gable front with overhanging eaves, topped by a belfry with the school bell.  Also on the property is a well built in 1951 and the former location of a privy constructed in 1884.  The school closed in 1931 and was reopened as a Community House by the Vale Home Demonstration Club in 1935.

It was listed on the National Register of Historic Places in 2011.

References

One-room schoolhouses in Virginia
School buildings on the National Register of Historic Places in Virginia
School buildings completed in 1884
Schools in Fairfax County, Virginia
National Register of Historic Places in Fairfax County, Virginia